Obinna Clinton “Obi” Emegano (born April 29, 1993) is a Nigerian-British professional basketball player who last played for Fuenlabrada of the Spanish Liga ACB. He plays shooting guard position. During the 2018–19 season he played for French Pro A side JDA Dijon. He signed with Le Mans Sarthe in July 2019. Emegano averaged 13.1 points, 3.1 rebounds and 1.7 assists per game. On May 25, 2020, he signed with Fuenlabrada. During the 2020–21 season he averaged 9.9 points per game. Emegano re-signed with the team on July 15, 2021.

References 

1993 births
Living people
A.S. Junior Pallacanestro Casale players
American expatriate basketball people in France
American expatriate basketball people in Italy
American expatriate basketball people in Poland
American expatriate basketball people in Spain
American men's basketball players
American sportspeople of Nigerian descent
Baloncesto Fuenlabrada players
Basketball players at the 2020 Summer Olympics
Basketball players from Oklahoma
Edmond Memorial High School alumni
JDA Dijon Basket players
KKS Pro-Basket Kutno players
Le Mans Sarthe Basket players
Liga ACB players
Nigerian expatriate basketball people in France
Nigerian expatriate basketball people in Italy
Nigerian expatriate basketball people in Poland
Nigerian expatriate basketball people in Spain
Nigerian men's basketball players
Olympic basketball players of Nigeria
Oral Roberts Golden Eagles men's basketball players
Shooting guards
Sportspeople from Edmond, Oklahoma
Western Illinois Leathernecks men's basketball players